Jungle Fever 2: Primal Fury is a sequel to an award winning 48HOURS film, set in a world cohabited by humans and puppets.

JF2 centers around a secret agent, monkey puppet named D.K. Bond. The story picks up where the first Jungle Fever ended.  D.K. Bond's archenemy, Bruce Torquemada, has kidnapped D.K.'s love interest, Bodil de Rezney, and is using her as bait to trap and destroy his furry nemesis. After successfully placing a wedge between D.K. and his girlfriend (by bribing him with a lifetime supply of bananas), D.K. retreats from secret agent life.  Eventually, he is sought out by Torquemada to assassinate Mario Andupme, a rival who has usurped him in a political coup.  In exchange, he will cure D.K.'s banana addition and give him information on the location of his former love, Bodil.  With the help of Torquemada's sexy assistant Ivana, D.K. takes up the offer in the hopes of restoring his former relationship with Bodil and freeing his fellow puppets from a sadistic, puppet-hating, Apartheid government.

It is currently being shown on Juice TV in New Zealand, 6 days a week (from April to September 2008).

It also won best webseries for the LA New Media Web Fest 2011

Current characters

External links 
Official site

2000s New Zealand television series
2008 New Zealand television series debuts
2008 New Zealand television series endings
New Zealand comedy television series
Juice (TV channel) original programming